Yaroslav Ihorovych Kvasov (born 5 March 1992) is a Ukrainian professional footballer who plays as a striker for Volyn Lutsk.

Career
Kvasov is a product of the FC Olimpik Donetsk School System. In 2011, he signed a contract with FC Zorya and then for two seasons played on loan for JK Sillamäe Kalev in the Meistriliiga.

He made his debut for FC Zorya in the match against FC Olimpik Donetsk on 6 March 2016 in the Ukrainian Premier League.

References

External links
 
 

1992 births
Living people
People from Sloviansk
Ukrainian footballers
Association football forwards
FC Zorya Luhansk players
FC Dinamo Batumi players
JK Sillamäe Kalev players
FC Telavi players
FC Kryvbas Kryvyi Rih players
FC Volyn Lutsk players
Meistriliiga players
Ukrainian Premier League players
Ukrainian First League players
Ukrainian Second League players
Ukrainian expatriate footballers
Expatriate footballers in Estonia
Ukrainian expatriate sportspeople in Estonia
Expatriate footballers in Georgia (country)
Ukrainian expatriate sportspeople in Georgia (country)
Sportspeople from Donetsk Oblast